Lawrence Anthony Miller (born April 15, 1965) is an American former professional football player who was a wide receiver in the National Football League (NFL) for the San Diego Chargers, Denver Broncos and Dallas Cowboys. He played college football at the University of Tennessee.

Early years

Miller attended John Muir High School in Pasadena, California, where he was a track standout, winning the 400 metres at the CIF Southern Section meet in 1983. He also competed in the long jump, 100 metres (10.3 seconds), 200 metres (20.6 seconds) and relay events.

He joined a football team for the first time in his life as a senior, at the urging of head coach Jim Brownfield. He registered 13 receptions for 230 yards and 2 touchdowns, but didn't generate much interest from recruiters. He also practiced basketball.

College career

Miller initially accepted a track & field scholarship from San Diego State, but transferred after one semester to Pasadena City College, when the coaches refused to allow him to play football in addition to running track.

In 1985, he became the state junior college champion in the 100 and 200 meters. He also had a break-out year in football, when he caught 47 passes for 881 yards and 9 touchdowns, rushed once for 63 yards and a touchdown, and returned 25 kickoffs for 786 yards.  His 1,728 all-purpose yards led all California junior college players, and he was named to the junior college All-American team.

Miller played at Tennessee during an era when the school garnered its reputation as "Wide Receiver U," with receivers such Anthony Hancock, Willie Gault, and Tim McGee preceding Miller as 1st-round NFL draft picks.  Three of Miller's teammates in the Vol receiving corps— Joey Clinkscales, Alvin Harper and Anthony Morgan— would also become NFL draftees.  Despite consistent competition for playing time, Miller amassed 765 yards and 5 touchdowns on 47 catches in just 17 games for the Vols, and returned 25 kickoffs for 547 yards.

Splitting time with the veteran Clinkscales during the 1986 season, Miller caught 36 passes for a team-leading 667 yards and 5 touchdowns, and returned 24 kickoffs for 522 yards.  In his debut against New Mexico, he caught 5 passes for 80 yards, and caught 5 passes for 66 yards in his SEC debut against Mississippi State.  In Tennessee's loss to Auburn, Miller provided the Vols' lone touchdown, catching a screen pass from Randy Sanders and racing 60 yards to the end zone.  Miller caught a 70-yard touchdown pass and returned 6 kickoffs for a school-record 126 yards in Tennessee's loss to Alabama. He had a 44-yard touchdown catch against Memphis State, and caught touchdown passes of 51 yards and 50 yards against Vanderbilt. He caught 6 passes for 72 yards in Tennessee's 21–14 win over Minnesota in the 1986 Liberty Bowl. He also practiced track.

During the 1987 season, Miller injured his knee in the opener against Iowa, he missed 5 games and struggled with injuries throughout the season.  Playing sparingly in just six games, he finished the regular season with 11 catches for 98 yards, and returned only one kickoff for 25 yards.  In Tennessee's 27–22 win over Indiana in the 1988 Peach Bowl, Miller caught 5 passes for 78 yards, including a 45-yard touchdown reception in the first quarter.

Professional career

San Diego Chargers
Miller was selected by the San Diego Chargers in the first round (15th overall) of the 1988 NFL Draft. He became a starter opposite fellow rookie Quinn Early, posting 36 receptions (tied for second on the team) for 526 yards (second on the team), 3 receiving touchdowns and a 25.9 kickoff return average (second on the team).

In 1989, he had a break-out performance and one of the best seasons in franchise history, leading the team with 75 receptions for 1,252, 10 receiving touchdowns and receiving Pro Bowl honors. He was specially effective in the second half of the season, when he tallied 47 receptions and 7 touchdowns in 8 games. He also took part in the NFL's "Fastest Man" competition, placing second to Darrell Green. The next year, he led the team with 63 receptions for 933 yards and 7 receiving touchdowns.

In 1991, he missed the last 3 games with an injury, recording 44 receptions (second on the team) for 649 yards (led the team) and 3 receiving touchdowns (tied for the team lead). The next year, he had an arthroscopic knee surgery before training camp that caused him to start slow, but recovered to post 72 receptions for 1060 yards (led the AFC) and 7 receiving touchdowns.

In 1993, he had 84 receptions for 1,162 yards and 7 receiving touchdowns.

Miller was a finalist in 2012 to be inducted into the San Diego Chargers Hall of Fame, but lost out to Darren Bennett who was voted in by the fans.

Denver Broncos
On March 17, 1994, he was signed as a free agent by the Denver Broncos, who were looking to replace wide receiver Vance Johnson. He became just the fourth player in franchise history to reach 1,000 receiving yards in a season, by registering 60 receptions (third on the team) for 1,107 yards (led the team) and 5 receiving touchdowns (led the team). It was also the first time in club history, that it had 2 receivers with 1,000 yards, when Shannon Sharpe tallied 1,010 yards.

In 1995, even though he missed two games with injuries, he had 59 receptions (second on the team) for 1,079 yards (led the team) and set a franchise record with 14 receiving touchdowns (shared with Demaryius Thomas ). The next year, he was second on the team with 56 receptions for 735 yards and 3 receiving touchdowns.

In 1996, he started 16 games, posting 56 receptions for 735 yards and three touchdowns. On June 2, 1997, he was surprisingly released in a salary-cap move, after the team decided to give third-year wide receiver Rod Smith the starting position.

Dallas Cowboys
On June 2, 1997, he signed as a free agent with the Dallas Cowboys, who were looking for a complement to wide receiver Michael Irvin and to replace the recently departed Kevin Williams. He missed all of training camp and most of the preseason, while recovering from an arthroscopic knee surgery he had during the offseason. Although he was limited with injuries, he still posted 16 starts, 46 receptions (third on the team) for 645 yards (second on the team) and 4 receiving touchdowns (second on the team). He wasn't re-signed after the season.

NFL career statistics

References

External links
 Chargers' Miller, Family Face a Brightening Future Together

1965 births
Living people
Sportspeople from Pasadena, California
Players of American football from Pasadena, California
American football wide receivers
San Diego State Aztecs men's track and field athletes
Pasadena City Lancers football players
Tennessee Volunteers football players
Tennessee Volunteers men's track and field athletes
San Diego Chargers players
Denver Broncos players
Dallas Cowboys players
American Conference Pro Bowl players